Minignan (also spelled Maninian) is a town in north-western Ivory Coast. It is a sub-prefecture of and the seat of Minignan Department. It is also a commune and the seat of Folon Region in Denguélé District.

History
The French explorer René Caillié stopped at Minignan in 1827 on his journey from Boké, in present-day Guinea, to Timbuktu in Mali. He was travelling with a caravan transporting kola nuts to Djenné. He described the village in his book Travels through Central Africa to Timbuctoo. 
We halted towards two o'clock at Manegnan [Minignan], a village inhabited by Bambaras; it contains about eight or nine hundred inhabitants; the natives call this part of the country Foulou, and like the Wassoulos they speak the Mandingo language; I did not perceive that they had any particular dialect. They are idolaters, or rather, they are without any religion; their food and clothes are like those of the inhabitants of Wassoulo; and they are equally dirty.

In 2014, the population of the sub-prefecture of Minignan was 14,521.

Villages
The 13 villages of the sub-prefecture of Minignan and their population in 2014 are:

References

Sub-prefectures of Folon Region
Communes of Folon Region
Regional capitals of Ivory Coast